Queen Sohye (舊1437-09-08 – 舊1504-04-27), of the Cheongju Han clan, was the only wife of Crown Prince Uigyeong. She never was the consort of a reigning king. Nevertheless, she was honored as Queen Insu (인수왕후) and later as Queen Dowager Insu (인수왕대비) during the reign of her son Yi Hyeol, King Seongjong. Moreover, she was later honored as Grand Queen Dowager Insu (인수대왕대비) during the reign of her grandson Yi Yung, Prince Yeonsan. After her death, she was posthumously honored with the title Queen Sohye (소혜왕후).

She is mostly known for her proficiency in the Chinese Classics, Confucian and Buddhist as well, and for her involvement in the political affairs of her time, from the accession of Prince Suyang to the throne to the reign of Yeonsangun. She authored the Naehun in 1475.

Lady Han, the Crown Princess 
Born as Han Do-san (한도산, 韓桃山), the future Queen Insu was born as a member of the Cheongju Han clan, a powerful yangban family with a long tradition of providing high-ranking officers and royal consorts as well. She was given a high education in Confucian values and the Chinese classics.

Lady Han married to Yi Jang, Prince Dowon, during the reign of Munjong, the 5th Joseon ruler. Their families decided this union when Han Hwak, her father, was 4th Councilor (좌찬성) and Suyang, Dowon's father, a Grand Prince among the others. After the 1453 coup, aka Gyeyu Jeongnan (계유정난), Grand Prince Suyang became Chief State Councilor (영의정) and Minister of Personnel (이조 판서) as well. In the same move, Han Hwak became Third State Councilor (우의정).

Moreover, Han Myeong-hoe (한명회 韓明澮), the organizer of the plot, was a third (older) cousin (육촌오빠)  of Lady Han, while Han Myeong-jin (한명진 韓明溍), another cousin, was also enlisted as 3,17 in the reward list (정난공신) for the coup. This started the network of her political influence.

In a second step, the 1455 coup deprived Danjong, the child King, of any power and instated Suyang to the throne, later honored with temple name Sejo. As a result, Dowon was elevated to the Crown Prince status as Crown Prince Uigyeong and Lady Han honored as Crown Princess Consort Su (수빈), as well as Crown Princess Consort Jeong (정빈) being used interchangeably, on 舊1455-07-26.

Insu, the Queen Mother 

In 1454, the Crown Princess bore Yi Jeong (Prince Wolsan), her first child, had a daughter (Princess Myeongsuk) the next year and gave birth to Yi Hyeol (Prince Jasan) in 1457. The same year, Uigyeong died on 舊1457-09-02. In the royal palace, the Crown Princess became known for her scholarly interest in Confucian education and she devoted herself to the education of the royal grandsons. She had a good relationship to King Sejo, who referred to her as a good daughter-in-law. At the death of Sejo, the 2nd son of the late King accessed to the throne and the influence of Lady Han waned. But the reign of Yejong only lasted 14 months. And then, Jasan, the second son of Lady Han  accessed to the throne in 1469.

At this date, the status of Lady Han was not so clear, since Uigyeong never reigned. In a first step (1470), Uigyeong was elevated and
honored posthumously as king without a temple name, so he was addressed as King Uigyeong (의경왕), and Lady Han received the ambiguous title of Queen Insu (인수왕비, Insu Wangbi). The next year, several of Insu's direct relatives were enlisted as meritorious subjects: Han Chi-hyeong (한치형, 淸城君) (2nd cousin 사천) as 3.17, together with her brothers Han Chi-in (한치인, 韓致仁), Han Chi-ui (한치의, 韓致義) and Han Chi-rye (한치례, 韓致禮) as 4.17, 4.23 and 4.26. Han Myeong-hoe himself was enlisted as 1.02.

In any case, the regency (1469–1476) was exerted by Grand Queen Dowager Jaseong, the mother-in-law of Insu, so that Insu's political influence was constrained to the point of not receiving a title acknowledging her as the mother of the reigning king. After some time, Insu's title still became matter of debate because queen consort title was reserved for primary consort of the reigning king, while Insu herself was the King's mother. But, in order to honour Insu as queen dowager, there was a need to determine the rank between her and Queen Dowager Inhye (Yejong's widow). Jaseong, as grand queen dowager and the most senior elder in the royal family, solved this problem with her statement that Insu had been entrusted with the task of protecting Yejong by the late King Sejo, implying her seniority above both the late Yejong and Queen Dowager Inhye. Thus, it was more appropriate to place Insu above Inhye. So Insu was honored as queen dowager in 1474 and had higher rank than Inhye, and her late husband received temple name Deokjong (덕종, 德宗), acknowledging them as Seongjong's formally recognized parents.

The young Queen Consort of the King died in 1474 at the age 17 and was posthumously honored as Queen Gonghye. The Ksitigarbha Pranidahana Sutra (The Great Vows of Ksitigarbha Bodhisattva) was commissioned by the three queens dowager through the Royal Treasury Agency. This Sutra is now considered an important artifact for the study of printing and Buddhism during the Joseon Dynasty.

Grand Queen Dowager Jaseong died in 1483 and was posthumously honored as Queen Jeonghui and Insu became the most influent elder in the palace, exerting a large part of the royal power. With the death of Seongjong and the accession of her grandson Yeonsangun, she became the Grand Queen Dowager Insu (인수대왕대비) and gathered even more power. At the end, this led to a brutal clash and she died in 1504 after an altercation with Yeonsangun who found out about the cause of his birth mother’s death.

After her death, she was granted the posthumous name Queen Sohye (소혜왕후). Her tomb is at Gyeongneung Royal Tomb, Goyang (敬陵),  just beside Dowon's tomb. The later is a very simple one, since Dowon was only a Crown Prince at his death in 1457. On the other hand, Sohye's tomb was built in full regalia, and placed at the left of the Dowon's tomb since, in 1504, Sohye was deceased with the status of Grand Queen Dowager.

Authorship 

Queen Insu authored of the Naehun (Instructions for women) in 1475. This books appears as a Confucian morality guidebook for women, describing appropriate behavior in accordance with Confucian ideals. It can also be read as a manifesto describing self-cultivation as the most appropriate behavior for a women, endorsing the political activities of the author.

With the exception of a few poems, this book is the first known book written by a woman in Korea.

Family 
 Father: Han Hwak (1400 - 舊1456-09-11) (한확)
 Grandfather: Han Yeong-jeong (한영정, 韓永矴)
 Grandmother: Lady Kim of the Uiseong Kim clan (증 정경부인 의성 김씨, 贈 貞敬夫人 義城 金氏)
 Mother: Lady Hong of the Namyang Hong clan (남양 홍씨) (1403 - 1450)
 Grandfather: Hong Yeo-bang (홍여방, 洪汝方)
 Grandmother: Lady Jeong of the Dongnae Jeong clan (정부인 동래 정씨, 東來 鄭氏)
 Husband: Yi Jang, Crown Prince Uigyeong (1438 – 舊1457-09-02) (이장 의경세자)
 Son: Yi Jeong, Grand Prince Wolsan (1454 - 舊1488-12-21) (이정 월산대군)
 Daughter-in-law: Grand Internal Princess Consort Seungpyeong of the Suncheon Park clan (1455 - 20 July 1506) (승평부대부인 박씨)
 Daughter: Princess Myeongsuk (1455 - 1482) (명숙공주)
 Son-in-law: Hong Sang (1457–1513) (홍상)
 Son: King Seongjong of Joseon (舊1457-07-30, 19 August 1457 – 20 January 1494) (조선 성종)
 Daughter-in-law: Queen Gonghye of the Cheongju Han clan (8 November 1456 – 舊1474-04-15, 30 April 1474) (공혜왕후 한씨)
 Daughter-in-law: Deposed Queen Jeheon of the Haman Yun clan (15 July 1455 – 舊1482-08-16, 29 August 1482) (제헌왕후 윤씨)
 Daughter-in-law: Queen Jeonghyeon of the Papyeong Yun clan (21 July 1462–13 September 1530) (정현왕후 윤씨)

In popular culture

Drama 
 Portrayed by Hwang Jeong-sun in the 1972 TBC TV series Song of a Parental Love
 Portrayed by Go Do-sim in the 1984-1985 MBC TV series 500 Years of Joseon: The Ume Tree in the Midst of the Snow
 Portrayed by Kim Yeong-ran in the 1994 KBS TV series Han Myeong-hoe
 Portrayed by Ban Hyo-jung in the 1995 KBS TV series Jang Noksu
 Portrayed by Chae Shi-ra in 1998–2000 KBS1 TV series The King and the Queen.
 Portrayed by Jeon In-hwa in the 2007–2008 SBS TV series The King and I.
 Portrayed by Chae Shi-ra and Hahm Eun-jung in the 2011–2012 JTBC TV series Insu, The Queen Mother.
 Portrayed by Moon Sook in the 2017 MBC TV series The Rebel.

Film 
 Portrayed by Jeon Ok in the 1962 film Prince Yeonsan
 Portrayed by Jeong Hye-seon in the 1987 film Prince Yeonsan
 Portrayed by Han Eun-jin in the 1988 film Diary of King Yeonsan.
 Portrayed by Yun So-jeong in the 2005 film The King and the Clown.
 Portrayed by Jang Yeong-nam in the 2017 film The King’s Case Note

Novels 
 Queen Dowager Insu by Shin Bong-seung, 1999, ISBN 89-88086-36-8
 Queen Dowager Insu by Yi Su-gwang, 2011, ISBN 978-89-962724-8-9
 The Woman Who Made the King, Shin Bong-seung, 2012, ISBN 978-89-6370-791-4

Sources 
  250 pages.
 
  viii+105 pages.

References

External links 

 Royal Ladies of Joseon Dynasty
 Royal Tombs of Joseon

1437 births
1504 deaths
Cheongju Han clan
15th-century Korean women writers
15th-century women rulers
Regents of Korea
People from Seoul